Matthew Okine (born 12 April 1985) is a stand-up comedian, author and radio presenter from Brisbane, Australia. Okine is of Ghanaian and European descent, born to his father, Mack Okine, and his mother Roslyn, who died of breast cancer when he was 12. He was a co-host on the Triple J breakfast show with Alex Dyson from 2014 to 2016.

Career 
Okine performed stand-up on Rove, at the Sydney Comedy Festival and Melbourne International Comedy Festival. He appeared on TV shows This is Littleton, Legally Brown, Would I Lie to You? and Hughesy, We Have a Problem and was a guest contributor on Dirty Laundry Live, Can of Worms and The Agony of Modern Manners. In 2012, he released a DVD titled Being Black n Chicken n Shit. He also appeared as Laurie in H2O: Just Add Water.

In 2014, Okine replaced Tom Ballard as co-host on the breakfast show on Triple J after Ballard resigned to pursue stand-up comedy. In 2016, Okine and Alex Dyson both left Triple J to pursue other interests. 

He co-hosted How Not to Behave, which ran for four months on ABC in 2015.

At the 2015 ARIA Awards, he won Best Comedy Release for Live at the Enmore Theatre.

In 2017, Okine wrote and starred in The Other Guy on Stan.

In November 2022, it was revealed that Okine would star as Arthur Beare in a 2023 "reimagining" of classic sitcom Mother and Son which originally aired on ABC TV from 1984 to 1994. Okine is also the creator, writer and executive producer of the new series. The concept to adapt the sitcom as a single-camera production from what was originally a multi-camera setup filmed in front of a live studio audience was first initiated by Okine in 2013.  Creator of the original series Geoffrey Atherden will collaborate with Okine on the 2023 version.

Discography

Awards and nominations

! 
|-
| 2015 || Live at the Enmore Theatre || rowspan="2"|  ARIA Award for Best Comedy Release ||  || rowspan="2"| 
|-
| 2016 || Play It Out (with Alex Dyson) ||  
|-

References

External links 
 
 Profile on Triple J

ARIA Award winners
Australian male comedians
Living people
People educated at Brisbane State High School
Triple J announcers
Australian people of Ghanaian descent
1985 births